Benedikt Kirsch (born 15 April 1996) is a German professional footballer who plays as a midfielder for  club SpVgg Bayreuth.

Personal life 
In 2021 October during the game between SpVgg Bayreuth and TSV Rain, Kirsch collapsed and was taken to hospital.

Honours
SpVgg Bayreuth
 Regionalliga Bayern: 2021–22

References

External links
 
 

Living people
1996 births
German footballers
Association football midfielders
SpVgg Greuther Fürth players
Türkgücü München players
SpVgg Bayreuth players
2. Bundesliga players
3. Liga players
Regionalliga players